Lee Ho-jae (born 14 October 2000) is a South Korean professional footballer, who plays as a center-forward for Pohang Steelers.

Club career 
After completing his youth development between New Zealand, with NRFL Premier club Onehunga Sports, and South Korea, where he played for Incheon United while his father Lee Ki-hyung was coaching the first team, Lee entered Korea University and eventually graduated in 2020.

At the start of 2021, Lee officially started his professional football career by joining K League 1 side Pohang Steelers. He subsequently made his professional debut on 28 February 2021, when he came in as a substitute for the injured Alex Grant in the 83rd minute of the 2-1 win against Incheon United.

On 28 June of the same year, he also made his debut in the AFC Champions League, as he replaced Go Young-Joon in the 88th minute of the group stage match against Malaysian side Johor Darul Ta'Zim, which ended up in a 4-1 win for Pohang.

On 3 October 2021, after coming in as a substitute for Lee Seung-Mo in the 76th minute of a league match against Gwangju FC, he scored his first and second professional goals (respectively, in the 83rd and 90th minutes), which proved to be crucial as his team ultimately gained a 3-2 come-back victory.

International career 
Lee joined the South Korean under-23 national team for the first time in September 2021, when he was invited by manager Hwang Sun-hong to take part in a training camp in Paju.

Personal life 
He is the son of former professional footballer and manager Lee Ki-hyung, who represented South Korea at full international level. He moved to New Zealand in 2007 when his father signed for Auckland City.

Career statistics

References

External links
 
 

2000 births
Living people
Korea University alumni
South Korean footballers
South Korea youth international footballers
Association football forwards
K League 1 players
Pohang Steelers players